Löbenicht Church was a Protestant church in the Löbenicht quarter of Königsberg, Germany.

History

Originally a Roman Catholic church known as "St. Barbara auf dem Berge", the church was built from 1334 to 1352 and then expanded in 1474. The top of its steeple was destroyed in a storm in 1497 and was rebuilt with four turrets. It was converted to Lutheranism after the 1525 establishment of the Duchy of Prussia. In 1608 Pastor Christoph Mirau wrote his Lobspruch der Stadt Königsberg.

After a lightning strike destroyed the church's steeple in 1695, it was rebuilt in 1702 with a gallery and four turrets. Seven people died after the church's vault collapsed in 1717. The church was destroyed during the great fire of Löbenicht on 11 November 1764; the steeple fell upon Löbenicht's school, setting it ablaze. Johann Ernst Löckel led the church's reconstruction, which was completed in 1776. In 1818 a storm damaged the flag and adornment atop the bell tower.

The church was decorated with bright colors in the Rococo style. Its combined pulpit/altar (Kanzelaltar) was carved by Friedrich Suhse in 1776. The organ was built by Johann Preuss (1722–90) in 1782 and was decorated with Rococo carvings, music-playing angels, and the crowned Prussian eagle.

The church was heavily damaged by the 1944 Bombing of Königsberg and was not rebuilt by the Soviet Union after the 1945 Battle of Königsberg. Pastor Link managed to bring a 1681 silver book cover from the church's collection with him to Hamburg in 1948. The church's remnants were demolished by the Soviet administration in Kaliningrad, Russia, in 1970.

Gallery

References

Churches completed in 1352
1334 establishments in Europe
1944 disestablishments in Germany
14th-century churches in Germany
Buildings and structures in Germany destroyed during World War II
Christian organizations established in the 14th century
Destroyed churches
Former churches in Königsberg
Lutheran churches in Königsberg
Lutheran churches converted from Roman Catholicism
Rococo architecture in Germany